The following are the national records in athletics in Zambia maintained by Zambia Athletics (ZA).

Outdoor

Key to tables:

+ = en route to a longer distance

h = hand timing

A = affected by altitude

OT = oversized track (> 200m in circumference)

a = aided road course

Men

Women

Mixed

Indoor

Men

Women

References
General
Zambian records 7 March 2020 updated 
Specific

Notes

External links
Zambia Athletics official website

Zambian
records
Athletics
Athletics